Ryan Anthony Johnson (born 2 October 1996) is a professional footballer who plays as a defender for  club Stockport County.

Johnson began his career in the youth academy at West Bromwich Albion before joining Stevenage of League One in 2013. He made his first-team debut in May 2014 and in doing so became the club's youngest player in the English Football League. Johnson had two loan spells in non-League at Boreham Wood, as well as spending time on loan at St Albans City, Nuneaton Town and Kidderminster Harriers.

He signed for Kidderminster on a permanent basis in January 2019 and spent a year-and-a-half playing regularly in the National League North. After playing one match for Rushall Olympic, Johnson signed for Hartlepool United in September 2020. He helped the club earn promotion back into the Football League during the 2020–21 season. Johnson signed for League Two club Port Vale in June 2021, before joining Stockport County in January 2022 for an undisclosed fee. Stockport won promotion as champions of the National League at the end of the 2021–22 season. He has also represented Northern Ireland at under-21 level.

Club career

Stevenage
Johnson started his career in the youth academy at West Bromwich Albion, where he spent seven years as a schoolboy. He was offered a scholarship by West Bromwich in the summer of 2013, but opted to leave and join Stevenage, where he felt he had a better chance of playing first-team football. Johnson trained regularly with the first-team alongside starting a two-year scholarship. Johnson made his professional debut on the final day of the 2013–14 season, on 3 May 2014, in a 2–0 away defeat to Brentford. In doing so, he became Stevenage's youngest debutant in the Football League at the age of 17 years and 215 days, a record that was broken by Liam Smyth (17 years and 37 days) in October 2018.

Loan spells
He played a peripheral role during the 2014–15 season, making all four of his appearances for Stevenage in the opening two months of the season. This included receiving a red card for two bookable offences within the space of six minutes in a 2–1 away defeat to Bury on 16 September 2014. A month later, on 24 October 2014, Johnson joined the Conference South club Boreham Wood on a one-month loan deal in order to "gain valuable first-team experience". He made one appearance during the brief spell, as a 90th-minute substitute in Boreham Wood's 2–1 win over Maidenhead United on 10 November 2014. He returned to Stevenage later that month and went on to appear for the club's development squad for the remainder of the season. The 2015–16 season followed a similar course with Johnson appearing regularly in the match-day squad, but often as an unused substitute, as he made seven appearances for the club during the season.

Ahead of the 2016–17 season, Johnson was loaned to the National League South club St Albans City with teammate Dipo Akinyemi until January 2017. The loan move came about after Johnson had spoken to the Stevenage manager Darren Sarll and informed him he wanted game-time. He made his debut on the opening day of the new season, playing the whole match as St Albans secured a 2–0 home win over Concord Rangers at Clarence Park. Johnson scored his first competitive goal in St Albans' 2–1 victory over Chelmsford City on 16 August 2016, scoring with a header from a corner kick. He suffered a knee injury while on international duty with the Northern Ireland under-21 team in September 2016 and was ruled out of action for two months, returning to the St Albans first-team at the start of December 2016. Johnson was recalled by Stevenage at the end of the month, a month earlier than the initial agreement. He made 12 appearances during the spell, scoring twice. Despite returning to Stevenage earlier than planned, Johnson did not play for the first-team during the second half of the season. In April 2017, he spent a week on trial at the Premier League club Tottenham Hotspur, playing 77 minutes in the development team's 4–1 defeat to Everton under-23s. No move materialised, and at the end of the month he went on a week-long trial at Norwich City, playing the whole match in a 0–0 draw with Brighton & Hove Albion under-23s.

Despite reported interest from Premier League and Championship clubs, Johnson remained at Stevenage and in July 2017, before the 2017–18 season, he rejoined Boreham Wood on a season-long loan agreement. After two starting appearances in Boreham Wood's opening three games, Johnson did not appear again and the loan deal was cut short in December 2017. Johnson was loaned once again on 5 January 2018, this time joining the National League North club Nuneaton Town for the remainder of the season. The move meant he was going to be playing under the manager Dino Maamria, who had previously coached him during his early years at Stevenage. Johnson made his Nuneaton debut in a 2–0 loss to Brackley Town on 6 January 2018. He was a mainstay in the centre of defence during his time at Nuneaton, making 19 appearances.

Kidderminster
Johnson was loaned out for a fifth time in June 2018, joining National League North club Kidderminster Harriers on a six-month loan agreement. He made his Kidderminster debut on the opening day of the 2018–19 season, playing the whole match in a 3–3 draw away at Alfreton Town. Having made 19 league appearances during his time at Kidderminster, Johnson signed for the club on a permanent basis on 4 January 2019. He joined Kidderminster for an undisclosed fee and on an 18-month contract, with Stevenage including a "significant sell-on fee" as part of the deal. Johnson scored his first goal for the club on 9 February 2019, scoring Kidderminster's third goal in an eventual 4–1 victory against Chester. He made 36 appearances in his maiden season at Kidderminster, scoring once, as they finished in 10th place in National League North. Johnson played 30 times during the 2019–20 season, scoring one goal, in a season that was curtailed by the COVID-19 pandemic in March 2020.

Hartlepool United
Without a club at the start of the 2020–21 season, Johnson began the season playing on non-contract terms at Southern League Premier Division Central club Rushall Olympic. He played one match, a 1–0 victory away at Leiston on 19 September 2020. Several days later, Johnson went on a one-week trial with National League club Hartlepool United, playing in a friendly match against Darlington. He subsequently signed for the club on a short-term contract on 29 September 2020. He made his debut in the club's 2–1 victory against Chesterfield on 6 October 2020, coming on as a first-half substitute and scoring the winning goal. After scoring twice in his first four appearances at Hartlepool, his contract was extended on 30 October 2020. Johnson signed a further contract extension on 22 January 2021, with the new agreement running for the remainder of the 2020–21 season. Johnson made 39 appearances during the season, scoring five times. This included three appearances in the National League play-offs that season, as Hartlepool earned promotion back into the Football League after beating Torquay United on penalties in the 2021 National League play-off Final. He left Hartlepool at the end of the season, with the club stating they could not match the offer Johnson received at his new club.

Port Vale
Out of contract upon the conclusion of the promotion-winning season at Hartlepool, Johnson signed for fellow League Two club Port Vale on a two-year contract on 27 June 2021. Port Vale manager Darrell Clarke said that "Ryan is a powerful left footed centre-half and at 24 is still a very good age in terms of development". Johnson found first-team opportunities limited in the first half of the 2021–22 season, starting three league matches and making eight appearances in all competitions during his time there.

Stockport County
Johnson joined National League club Stockport County for an undisclosed fee on 6 January 2022, having previously played under Dave Challinor at Hartlepool; Port Vale director of football David Flitcroft revealed that add-on fee clauses had been included in the transfer. He made his debut for Stockport five days later in a 4–1 victory at Altrincham. Johnson scored his first goal for the club on 15 January 2022, in a 3–0 victory against Larkhall Athletic in an FA Trophy fixture at Edgeley Park. He made 23 appearances in the second half of the 2021–22 season as Stockport returned to the Football League as champions of the National League.

International career
Johnson was first called up to represent Northern Ireland at under-21 level in September 2015, when he played the whole match in a 2–1 loss to Scotland under-21s in a 2017 UEFA European under-21 Championship qualifier. Three days later, on 8 September 2015, he scored his first international goal in a 1–1 away draw with Iceland under-21s in Reykjavík. He went on to make four appearances, scoring once, as Northern Ireland finished bottom of the qualification group. He remained a mainstay in the centre of defence for the under-21 team for their 2019 UEFA European under-21 Championship qualifiers.

Style of play
Johnson is left-footed. He has been deployed at left-back and centre-back throughout his career. He prefers to play as a centre-back. Described as a "ball-playing defender" during his time at Hartlepool, he was utilised as the left-sided centre-back of a three-man central defence during the 2020–21 season.

Career statistics

Honours
Hartlepool United
National League play-offs: 2021

Stockport County
National League: 2021–22

References

External links

1996 births
Living people
Footballers from Birmingham, West Midlands
English footballers
Association footballers from Northern Ireland
Northern Ireland under-21 international footballers
Association football defenders
Stevenage F.C. players
Boreham Wood F.C. players
St Albans City F.C. players
Nuneaton Borough F.C. players
Kidderminster Harriers F.C. players
Rushall Olympic F.C. players
Hartlepool United F.C. players
Port Vale F.C. players
Stockport County F.C. players
English Football League players
National League (English football) players
English people of Northern Ireland descent